The Mahamanina Falls is a  waterfall in the region of Diana in the north of Madagascar. It is located 15 km from Ambanja via Route nationale 6. Two more falls are situated on the Mirahavavyse River at 14 km on the road to Sambirano.

References

Waterfalls of Madagascar
Diana Region